In the United States, a Local School Food Authority (LSFA) is the administering unit for the operation of a school feeding program. It receives federal meal reimbursements for meal programs and is responsible for ensuring that meal counts and eligibility criteria are met. This may be a school district, several school districts, or individual schools.

See also
National School Lunch Program

United States Department of Agriculture
Academic meals